This is a list of material originally published by other companies that has been reprinted as collected editions or trade paperbacks by Dark Horse Comics, including manga and manhwa series that were translated and distributed in America.

North American comics

European comics

Manga
Unless otherwise noted, the manga volumes contain the same material (but translated) as the original language volumes.

Manhwa

Webcomics

References 

Dark Horse Comics reprints